The schock was an historical coin of account in the Kingdom of Saxony as well as in Bohemia and Silesia.

In the Kingdom of Saxony, a distinction was made, based on the old use of the word, whereby 1 schock = 60 units:
 1 new or heavy schock = 60 good groschen = 3 old schocks, worth  of a Convention gulden = 225 kreuzers.

There were also different units of currency called the schock in Bohemia and Silesia (Czech kopa):
 1 old Bohemian schock = 60 Böhmen, worth  Speciesthaler = 3 Convention guilders = 180 kreuzers;
 1 new or small Bohemian schock' = 40 Böhmen =  old bohemian schocks, whereby 1 Speciesthaler = 2 Convention guilders = 60 double kreuzers;
 1 schock Gröschel = 60 Gröschel =  old Bohemian schocks, corresponding to  Convention guilders = 45 kreuzers = 180 pfennigs.

A Böhmen (lit.: "Bohemia") was the name of the groschen in Prague and Bohemia; a Gröschel  was also called a Fledermaus ("bat").

 Literature 
 Johann Friedrich Krüger: Vollständiges Handbuch der Münzen, Maße und Gewichte aller Länder der Erde. Gottfried Basse, Quedlinburg/Leipzig 1830, p. 94.
 Johann Jacob Ebert: Unterweisung in den philosophischen und mathematischen Wissenschaften: für die obern Classen der Schulen und Gymnasien.'' Christian Gottlieb Hertel, Leipzig 1779, p. 227.

Coins of the Holy Roman Empire
History of Saxony
History of Bohemia
History of Silesia